Haps may refer to:

People 
 Haps Benfer (c. 1893-1966), American football and basketball player and college coach and administrator
 Marie Haps (1879-1939), Luxembourg-born Belgian educationalist
 Ridgeciano Haps (born 1993), Dutch footballer

Other uses 
 
Haps, a Dutch village
 Haps Magazine
 High altitude platform station
 High altitude pseudo satellite or Atmospheric satellite
 Histories and Addresses of Philosophical Societies
 Hydrazine Auxiliary Propulsion System, a rocket upper stage developed by Orbital Sciences Corporation
 haps, social gatherings of youth in Laestadianism
Institut libre Marie Haps, a college of higher education based in Brussels, Belgium
Marie Haps Faculty of Translation and Interpreting, a faculty of Saint-Louis University, Brussels (UCLouvain)

See also
 HAP (disambiguation)